Karl Gall (5 October 1905 – 27 February 1943) was an Austrian footballer. He played in eleven matches for the Austria national football team from 1931 to 1936.

Personal life
Gall served as a Gefreiter (lance corporal) in the German Army during the Second World War. He was killed in action on the Eastern Front on 27 February 1943.

References

External links
 

1905 births
1943 deaths
Austrian footballers
Austria international footballers
Association footballers not categorized by position
Footballers from Vienna
German Army soldiers of World War II
German Army personnel killed in World War II
Burials in Russia
Military personnel from Vienna